Assineau River 150F is an Indian reserve of the Swan River First Nation in Alberta, located within the Municipal District of Lesser Slave River No. 124.

References

Indian reserves in Alberta